Dionys van Dongen (3 September 1748, Dordrecht – 21 May 1819, Rotterdam) was a Dutch painter.

Van Dongen was initially taught by his father who was also an artist. He painted primarily marine art and genre art. In 1771 he settled in Rotterdam and painted flower still lifes and landscapes. He often painted copies of old masters.

References

Dionys van Dongen at the RKD database

1748 births
1819 deaths
18th-century Dutch painters
18th-century Dutch male artists
Artists from Dordrecht
Dutch genre painters
Dutch male painters
Dutch marine artists